Catullus 16 or Carmen 16 is a poem by Gaius Valerius Catullus (c. 84 BC – c. 54 BC). The poem, written in a hendecasyllabic (11-syllable) meter, was considered to be so sexually explicit following its rediscovery in the following centuries that a full English translation was not published until the 20th century. The first line, Pēdīcābo ego vōs et irrumābō ("I will sodomize and face-fuck you"), sometimes used as a title, has been called "one of the filthiest expressions ever written in Latin—or in any other language".

Carmen 16 is significant in literary history as an artistic work censored for its obscenity, but also because the poem raises questions about the proper relation of the poet, or his life, to the work.
Subsequent Latin poets referenced the poem not for its invective, but as a work exemplary of freedom of speech and obscene subject matter that challenged the culturally prevalent decorum or moral orthodoxy of the period. Ovid, Pliny the Younger, Martial, and Apuleius all invoked the authority of Catullus in asserting that while the poet himself should be a respectable person, his poetry should not be constrained.

Censored editions
Several editions of Catullus' works omit the more explicit parts of the poem. A noteworthy example is the 1924 Loeb edition: this omits lines 1 and 2 from the English translation, but includes them in the Latin; lines 7–14 are omitted from both Latin and English; a later Loeb edition gives the complete text in both languages. Other editions have been published with the explicit words blanked out.

NPR bleep censored the first line of Catullus 16, both in Latin and English translation in the radiophonic exchange between Guy Raz and Mary Beard in 2009. C. H. Sisson writes "the obscenity of Catullus has long been a stumbling block". He follows Loeb, omitting poem lines as non-sequitur:

Thomas Nelson Winter notes: "In the sense that this is the normal language of those to whom he directs the poem, it is not obscene. Obscenity, like beauty, is in the eyes of the beholder".

Social and literary context

The poem raises questions about the proper relation of the poet, or his life, to the work. Catullus addresses the poem to two men, Furius and Aurelius. Furius refers to Marcus Furius Bibaculus, a first-century BC poet who had an affair with Juventius, Catullus' lover. Aurelius refers to Marcus Aurelius Cotta Maximus Messalinus, a first-century BC consul, or senator, during the Julio-Claudian dynasty.

Those two men either together or singly also appear in so called Catullus' Furius and Aurelius "cycle", in poems 11, 15, 21, 23, 24 and 26. The cycle considers sexual themes and with the exception of Catullus 11 uses an abusive language toward the two. The two are described elsewhere as fellow members of Catullus' cohort of friends: comites Catulli. According to Catullus 16, Furius and Aurelius find Catullus's verses to be molliculi ("tender" or "delicate"), implicating that the author is an effeminate poet. According to T. P. Wiseman, Catullus speaks about himself in feminine terms even in his love poetry. Catullus's gentle attitude left him vulnerable in the cynical and cruel environment of Roman high society. The criticism of Furius and Aurelius was directed at Catullus 5, apparently from "many thousands of kisses" at line 12. Kenneth Quinn observes:

Catullus maligns the two and threatens them with rape. According to T. P. Wiseman, Catullus used the obscenity to get his message that "soft" poetry could be more arousing than explicit description to "sensibilities so much cruder than his own". According to Thomas Nelson Winter, Catullus could still claim that he has a pure life (79.16), despite the self evidence of pederasty (poems 14, 109) and his love of a married woman (poem 83 mentions Lesbia's husband).

Craig Arthur Williams says Catullus 16 demonstrates that in Roman ideology of masculine vir, a man is not compromised by his penetration of other males, in fact his manhood status is bolstered. Mary Beard finds the poem's message to be ironic:

Latin text and translation

Micaela Wakil Janan offers the following modern English prose translation of the poem:

Sexual terminology

Latin is an exact language for obscene acts, such as pedicabo and irrumabo, which appear in the first and last lines of the poem. The term pedicare is a transitive verb, meaning to "insert one's penis into another person's anus". The term pathicus in line 2 refers to the "bottom" person in that act, i.e., the one being penetrated. The term irrumare is likewise a transitive verb, meaning to "insert one's penis into another person's mouth for suckling", and derives from the Latin word, rūma meaning "udder" (as in: "to give something to suck on"). A male who suckles a penis is denoted as a fellator or, equivalently, a pathicus (line 2).
Catullus neither confirms nor denies the claim of Aurelius and Furius that he is "not a man", since sexual slang "irrumare" and "pedicare" while having sexual slang meaning of homosexuality, could also mean as little as "go to hell".

Pedagogy
Paul Allen Miller, Professor of Comparative Literature and Classics at the University of South Carolina, suggests Catullus 16 contains information regarding:
 the historical mutability of socially accepted behavior
 the constructed nature of sexual identity
 the nature and function of gender
 the omnipresence and play of both power and resistance
 the admonitory and optative function of poetic art

Notes

References
 
 
 
 
 
 Selden, D. L. (2007), "Ceveat lector: Catullus and the Rhetoric of Performance" in Catullus (Oxford Readings in Classical Studies), ed. J. Gaisser. Oxford: Oxford University Press: 490-559. ISBN  0199280355

External links

 Alternate translation from Negenborn
 Latin text with comments (go to poems 11 and 16 for remarks on c. 16)
 Translation and commentary on lines 5-6
 Scanned version of c.16

Obscenity controversies in literature
C016
Articles containing video clips
LGBT-related controversies in literature